Emmett "Red Fox" McLemore (September 12, 1899 – May 19, 1973) was a professional football player who played in the National Football League during the 1923 season. That season, he joined the NFL's Oorang Indians. The Indians were a team based in LaRue, Ohio, composed only of Native Americans, and coached by Jim Thorpe. Emmett was a Cherokee.

On December 2, 1923, McLemore recorded a touchdown to Arrowhead and made a field goal after a Joe Guyon interception. However, he missed two extra point kicks in a 22-19 loss to the Chicago Cardinals. During that same game a McLemore punt hit a Cardinals' player and was soon picked up by Ted Buffalo for a score. A week later on December 7, McLemore caught two passes from Guyon for touchdowns in a 19-0 victory over the Louisville Brecks.

He spent the 1924 season playing in 4 NFL games with the Kansas City Blues.

References

Uniform Numbers of the NFL

Notes

1899 births
1973 deaths
People from Adair County, Oklahoma
Native American players of American football
Players of American football from Oklahoma
Oorang Indians players
Kansas City Blues (NFL) players
Haskell Indian Nations University alumni
Cherokee Nation sportspeople
Pittsburg State Gorillas football players
20th-century Native Americans